Fabric 36 is a 2007 album by Ricardo Villalobos. Whilst the album was released as part of the Fabric mix CD series, it is composed entirely of new material by Villalobos and several collaborators, and as such could be considered a full studio album. It is the first fabric mix to contain only an artist's own work since Pure Science's Fabric 05.  "Andruic", "Fizpatrick", "Primer encuentro Latino-Americano" and "Farenzer House" were later released unedited on Villalobos' next album, Sei Es Drum.

Track listing

CD
  Ricardo Villalobos - Groove 1880
  Ricardo Villalobos - Perc and Drums
  Ricardo Villalobos - Moongomery
  Ricardo Villalobos - Farenzer House
  Ricardo Villalobos & Patrick Ense - M.Bassy
  Ricardo Villalobos - Mecker
  Ricardo Villalobos & Jorge Gonzales - 4 Wheel Drive
  Ricardo Villalobos & Patrick Ense - Fizpatrick
  Ricardo Villalobos & Andrew Gillings - Andruic & Japan
  Ricardo Villalobos - Organic Tranceplant
  Ricardo Villalobos - Prevorent
  Ricardo Villalobos & Fumiya Tanaka - Fumiyandric 2
  Ricardo Villalobos - Won't You Tell Me
  Ricardo Villalobos - Primer Encuentro Latino-Americano
  Ricardo Villalobos - Chropuspel Zündung

References

External links
 Fabric: Fabric 36
 

36
2007 compilation albums